The Joclin-Bradley-Bowling House is a historic house at 160 Arkansas Highway 95W in Clinton, Arkansas.  It is a -story wood-frame structure, with a front-facing gabled roof, weatherboard siding, and a concrete block foundation.  The roof has exposed rafter ends in the gables, and shelters a recessed porch which is supported by bracketed square posts set on brick piers.  The house was built in 1854, and extensively altered in 1921 to give it its current Craftsman appearance.

The house was listed on the National Register of Historic Places in 2007.

See also
National Register of Historic Places listings in Van Buren County, Arkansas

References

Houses on the National Register of Historic Places in Arkansas
Houses completed in 1854
National Register of Historic Places in Van Buren County, Arkansas
1854 establishments in Arkansas
American Craftsman architecture in Arkansas
Bungalow architecture in Arkansas
Houses in Van Buren County, Arkansas